Andrew Crossland (30 November 1816 – 17 November 1902) was an English first-class cricketer, active 1844–55 who played for Sheffield Cricket Club . Born in Dalton, Huddersfield, he died in November 1902 in Hull. His son Samuel Crossland also played first-class cricket.

References
Cricket Archive Statistics

1816 births
1902 deaths
Cricketers from Huddersfield
English cricketers of 1826 to 1863
English cricketers
Yorkshire cricketers
North v South cricketers
All-England Eleven cricketers